Thymosopha is a genus of moth in the family Gelechiidae. It contains the species Thymosopha antileuca, which is found in South Africa.

The wingspan is 14–15 mm. The forewings are dark fuscous, with slight purple gloss and a triangular white blotch on the dorsum before the middle, its apex 
almost touching the costa at one-fourth. There is a smaller triangular white blotch on the costa at three-fourths, reaching half across the wing. The hindwings are grey.

References

Endemic moths of South Africa
Gelechiinae